Langtang is a town and LGA in Plateau State, Nigeria. The town is located in the southern part of Plateau state and connected to Tunkus, Shendam, Kanam and Wase through paved roads.

It has the local government secretariat and the Ponzhi Tarok palace situated at the heart of the town. It is the home to Prominent Nigeria Military Generals, who include Generals Domkat Bali (deceased), Joseph Nanven Garba (deceased), Jeremiah Useni, Joshua Dogonyaro (deceased), John Shagaya, Jonathan Temlong, Musa Gambo, Yakubu Rimdam, and Ishaku Pennap. Others are Air Marshal Jonah Wuyep, Air Vice Marshal Napoleon B. Bali, General Samuel Nankpak Abashe, Air Commodore Bernard Banfa and General Muhammad A. Najib as well. It is also hometown to elder statesmen; Chief Solomon Lar (the first Civilian Governor of Plateau State) (deceased), Chief Ezekiel S. Yusuf (deceased) (the first Executive Chairman of Langtang Local Government) and Reverend Canon Selchang Miner.

Langtang has a General Hospital and schools spread across the Local Government amongst which are Federal Government Girls College, Langtang, Government Secondary School Langtang. The town has two dams and a water treatment plant that caters for its populace.
The major tribe is Tarok, their language is Tarok, and their major religions are Christianity and ATR. 
They produce farm produce like groundnuts, millet, guinea corn, etc.

See also
Langtang Mafia
Tarok people

References

Populated places in Plateau State